"I Hope Ur Miserable Until Ur Dead" (stylized in all lowercase) is a song by American musician and social media personality Nessa Barrett released on August 6, 2021, as the lead single from her debut EP Pretty Poison.  The song debuted at number 88 on the Billboard Hot 100, becoming her first entry on the chart.

Commercial performance
In the United States, "I Hope Ur Miserable Until Ur Dead" debuted at number 88 on the Billboard Hot 100 and at number 66 on the Rolling Stone Top 100, becoming Barrett's first entry on both charts.  Additionally, the song debuted at number 38 in Ireland.

Music video
The song was released alongside a music video directed by Hannah Lux Davis.

Personnel
Credits adapted from Tidal.
 Nessa Barrett – songwriting, vocals
 Evan Blair – production, songwriting, bass, drum programming, electric guitar, recording engineer
 Slush Puppy – acoustic guitar, electric guitar
 Anthony Vilchis – assistant mix engineer
 Chris Galland – assistant mix engineer
 Zach Pereyra – assistant mix engineer
 Tim Randolph – bass, electric guitar, songwriting
 John Greenham – mastering
 Manny Marroquin – mixing
 Jeremie Inhaber – mixing engineer
 Samuel C Harris – recording engineer
 Madi Yanofsky – songwriting
 Samuel Mark Catalano – songwriting

Charts

Weekly charts

Year-end charts

Certifications

Release history

References

2021 singles
2021 songs